Guayas may refer to:

Guayas River, Ecuador
Guayas Province, Ecuador
BAE Guayas, ships of the Ecuadorian navy
Guayas (chief), a legendary chief of the Huancavilcas in the coastal plains of modern Ecuador
The fruit of the mamoncillo tree

fr:Guayas